Andosols are soils found in volcanic areas formed in volcanic tephra. In some cases Andosols can also be found outside active volcanic areas. Andosols cover an estimated 1–2% of earth's ice-free land surface. Andosols are a Reference Soil Group of the World Reference Base for Soil Resources (WRB). They are closely related to other types of soils such as Vitrosols, Vitrandosols, Vitrons and Pumice Soils that are used in different soil classification systems. Poorly developed Andosols are often rich in vitreous materials and are therefore also called Vitric Andosols. In the USDA soil taxonomy, Andosols are known as Andisols.

Andosols are usually defined as soils containing high proportions of glass and amorphous colloidal materials, including allophane, imogolite and ferrihydrite. Because they are generally quite young, Andosols typically are very fertile except in cases where phosphorus is easily fixed (this sometimes occurs in the tropics). They can usually support intensive cropping, with areas used for wet rice in Java supporting some of the densest populations in the world. Other Andosol areas support crops of fruit, maize, tea, coffee or tobacco. In the Pacific Northwest USA, Andosols support very productive forests.

Andosols occupy ~1% of global ice-free land area. Most occur around the Pacific Ring of Fire, with the largest areas found in central Chile, Ecuador, Colombia, Mexico, the Pacific Northwest US, Japan, Java and New Zealand's North Island. Other areas occur in the East African Rift, Italy, Iceland and Hawaii. They are the most common type of soil in the Azores.

Fossil Andosols are known from areas far from present-day volcanic activity and have in some cases been dated as far back as the Precambrian 1.5 billion years ago.

Suborders

Aquands – Andosols with a water table at or near the surface for much of the year.
Gelands – Andosols of very cold climates (mean annual temperature <0 °C).
Cryands – Andosols of cold climates.
Torrands – Andosols of very dry climates.
Ustands – Andosols of semiarid and sub humid climates.
Udands – Andosols of humid climates.
Xerands – temperate Andosols with very dry summers and humid winters.
Vitrands – relatively young Andosols that are coarse-textured and dominated by glass.

See also 
Pedogenesis
Pedology (soil study)
Soil classification
Trumao

References

Further reading
 W. Zech, P. Schad, G. Hintermaier-Erhard: Soils of the World. Springer, Berlin 2022, Chapter 11.3.3.

External links 
 profile photos (with classification) WRB homepage
 profile photos (with classification) IUSS World of Soils

Pedology
Types of soil
Volcanic soils